Málaga Airport , officially Málaga–Costa del Sol Airport since June 2011, is the fourth busiest airport in Spain after Madrid–Barajas, Barcelona and Palma de Mallorca. It is significant for Spanish tourism as the main international airport serving the Costa del Sol. The airport has flight connections to over 60 countries worldwide, and over 14.4 million passengers passed through it in 2015. In 2017, 18.6 million passengers passed through Málaga Airport.

The airport operates with three terminals.  The third terminal adjacent to the previous two opened on 15 March 2010, with flight operations commencing the following day. A second runway opened on 26 June 2012.

Málaga Airport is the busiest international airport of Andalusia, accounting for 85 per cent of the autonomous community's non-domestic traffic. It offers a wide variety of international destinations. The airport, connected to the Costa del Sol, has a daily link with twenty cities in Spain and over one hundred cities in Europe. Direct flights also operate to Africa, the Middle East and also to North America in the summer season. Airlines with a base at the airport are Air Europa, Norwegian, Scandinavian Airlines, Ryanair, Vueling and Easyjet which operates a seasonal base.

History and development

Málaga Airport is one of the oldest Spanish airports that has stayed in its original location.

Málaga Airport opened on 9 March 1919.   After test flights, the first scheduled air service from Málaga began on 1 September 1919 when Didier Daurat began regular flights between Toulouse, Barcelona, Alicante, Tangier and Casablanca.

The single runway was extended in the 1960s, and a new terminal was erected in the centre of the site. During this period of development, new navigational equipment was installed, including radar system at the end of the decade, in 1970.

The airport was given its current title in 1965. In 1968 a new passenger terminal was opened. In 1972 a second passenger terminal was opened to cater specifically for non-scheduled traffic. An increase in companies offering package holidays (around 30 by 1965) meant that this type of traffic was providing an increasing proportion of the airport's business. The terminal was very similar to the ones that were built in Palma de Mallorca, Alicante, Ibiza and Girona.

On 30 November 1991, a new passenger terminal opened at the airport which is today's Terminal 2. It was designed by Ricardo Bofill Taller de Arquitectura. Almost all services moved their operations to this terminal when it opened with the exception of checking in.

In 1995, the old passenger building was converted into a general aviation terminal, and a new hangar for large aircraft maintenance was built to the north of the airport site. Also constructed was a terminal specifically catering for cargo traffic a year later, along with a hangar for maintenance of big aircraft. In 1997 an enlargement of the parking of gates was built and fuel systems were added at all the gates.

The airport's domestic departures section once had the head office of Binter Mediterraneo.

In November 2002 a new control tower was built with a height of 54m,.

In 2004 the "Málaga Plan" was started, including ideas for construction of a new terminal, and a new runway.

In 2005 the old passenger terminal from the late 60s was demolished to make room for the planned expansion of the airport.

In November 2005 Monarch Airlines opened a base at Málaga. It based an Airbus A320-200 there and operated scheduled services were added to Aberdeen, Blackpool and Newquay. However, due to their routes being unpopular, the base was closed in 2007. In March 2007, Clickair opened a base at Málaga after announcing a new route to Barcelona. The base has remained since the airline merged with Vueling.

On 26 February 2009, Ándalus Líneas Aéreas started operations from Málaga, but then ceased operations in August 2010. This was the only airline that had their main base at Málaga, until Helitt Líneas Aéreas opened their base in late 2011. On 16 December 2009, low-cost carrier Ryanair announced a base at this airport. This would be their 38th base with an additional 19 routes, bringing Ryanair's total routes from Málaga to 39. The base opened on 23 June 2010. An extra route to Barcelona was announced after the planned opening of their Barcelona base.

On 15 March 2010, the new Terminal 3 was completed. It was opened by King Juan Carlos of Spain, opening to public use the following day. On 10 September 2010, the suburban railway station at Málaga Airport was opened, providing access to catch a train to Málaga from Terminal 3.

In November 2011, Helitt Líneas Aéreas opened their base at Málaga, operating flights to Melilla Airport as well as opening additional routes. The company ceased operations in November 2014.

On 17 May 2012, the first commercial landings on the second runway took place for the first time. The first aircraft to use it was a PA-28 private 4 seated single engine light aircraft and the first commercial flight was Transavia Flight HV6115 from Amsterdam, operated by a Boeing 737-800. A total of 44 aircraft landed on the new runway. The runway was placed into service after the airport obtained the safety clearance of Civil Aviation on 30 April 2012. The runway officially opened on 26 June 2012 and it was inaugurated by the Spanish Minister of Transport, Ana Pastor. It is located on the other side of the terminals where the current runway is. It is in the direction of 12/30 and it has three rapid exits.

In June 2017, Scandinavian Airlines Ireland announced they were to open a base at Málaga. The base opened in June 2018 and operated until April 2020. On 14 March 2018, it was announced that Primera Air were also to open a base at the airport with one based aircraft and six new routes. The base was to open on 27 October 2018, however this did not happen as the company ceased operations on 1 October 2018.

On 8 October 2020, it was announced that EasyJet would open a seasonal base at Málaga. The based flights will be operated by subsidiary EasyJet Europe.

Terminals
Málaga Airport has three adjacent terminals, although only two are in use. It also has a General Aviation Terminal and a Cargo Terminal. Passengers can interchange between Terminal 2 and Terminal 3 both landside and airside. The Airport consists of three piers or docks used by airlines: Pier B (with 13 gates, seven with airbridges) and Pier C (with 10 gates, seven with airbridges) in Terminal 2, and Pier D (with 20 gates, 12 with airbridges) in Terminal 3. Pier B is used for non-European and non-Schengen traffic (as well as Schengen flights on the ground floor), Pier C is used for both Schengen and non-Schengen Traffic and Pier D is used by Schengen Traffic. EasyJet, EasyJet Switzerland & Ryanair flights check in at Terminal 2 whilst all others use Terminal 3. The terminals have a total of 164 check-in desks, and have a total of 48 boarding gates of which 26 have airbridges.

Terminal 1
Terminal 1 (styled as T1) opened on 30 June 1972 and was used for flights to non-Schengen destinations, along with flights to Ceuta and Mellila. On 16 March 2010, flights to non-Schengen destinations moved to Pier C in Terminal 3 and flights to Ceuta and Mellila moved to Pier D, leaving Terminal 1 operating no flights, although Jet2.com continued to checked in flights there for a short time but moved to Terminal 2 shortly afterwards. The terminal has now been closed to the public.

The terminal 1 baggage hall was shown in the episode "The Return of the Seven: Part 1" in series 2 of Auf Wiedersehen, Pet.

Terminal 2

Terminal 2 (styled as T2) was opened on 30 November 1991, known as the Pablo Ruiz Picasso terminal. The building was designed by architect Ricardo Bofill, and was built to be operated in combination with the pre-existing passenger terminal. It has three floors and a basement, the second floor is for departures and the ground floor is for arrivals. The first floor is used for the lower level for Pier B, and for alleyways leading to arrivals. The basement is for the rental-car pickup desks. To complete the terminal, a building was built for car parking and rental cars, which were built right next to the entrance of the departures and arrivals lounges.

Development work was completed on the terminal in 2008. The original structure leading to Pier C in departures was demolished and replaced with a temporary structure to allow building work for Terminal 3 to be completed in its place. The temporary structure was closed and removed once Terminal 3 opened and Pier C is now accessed from Terminal 3.

Work in the terminal had to be done before the new terminal opened. Because terminal 1 was due to close, all of the gate numbers had to be changed. The only gate that kept its original gate number was B16. The last flight to use the original gate numbers, was an Aer Lingus flight to London Gatwick. When Terminal 3 opened, the old arrivals waiting area was converted to a passengers' transfer between terminals in the arrivals hall where three extra baggage carousels have since been added.

Terminal 2 has been refurbished since Terminal 3 has opened costing around €2.5 million. The arrivals floor of Terminal 2 was refurbished in early 2011, and all the ceilings were painted between late 2013 and mid 2014. There is also currently work on the old shopping area, currently closed off. In September 2017 it was announced that Terminal 2 was to undergo a further refurbishment costing €8.4 million. This includes the improvements of the toilet facilities, new flooring and the repainting of the exterior of the building. Pier C closed for refurbishment on 12 November 2018 and reopened on 18 March 2019 while Pier B was due to be refurbished in the winter of 2019.

Terminal 3

Terminal 3 (styled as T3) is a new terminal at Málaga Airport. Plans for construction started in 2001 and construction started in 2004. The works were carried out by Ferrovial. It was opened on 15 March 2010 by King Juan Carlos.

The new terminal building at Málaga Airport has been designed by architect Bruce S. Fairbanks. The terminal was built to increase tourism around the Costa Del Sol, and to expand the airport due to increasing number of passengers. It is adjacent to Terminal 2 and has an area of 250,000m², which is more than double the size of Terminal 2. It has 86 check-in counters, numbered 301 to 386, 20 new boarding gates, twelve which will have airbridges and 12 baggage reclaim carousels; nine European Union, two non-European Union and one special baggage reclaim carousel.

The terminal has more than doubled capacity to 30 million passengers or 9,000 an hour, is expected to double the number of flights and the 12,813,764 passengers handled during 2008, and this has increased further since the new runway was completed.

General aviation terminal
The general aviation terminal at Málaga Airport (also known as the private aviation terminal) is located next to the N-340 motorway, and close to runway 31. The terminal was formed from the old passenger terminal building, and has since been renewed and refurbished. It was opened on 29 January 1968 and is used for private jets.

Cargo terminal
The cargo terminal was opened in 1996, with 16 docking bays for road transport vehicles. It is located in the north of the airport, named "Carga Aena" in Spanish.

Other
A car park has been built with seven floors and 2,500 parking spaces, with underground parking for 66 coaches. A long stay car park opened in mid-2010.

Airlines and destinations
The following airlines operate regular scheduled and charter services to and from Málaga:

Statistics
Passenger numbers at Málaga increased from 6 million in 1995 to 13.6 million passengers in 2007, dropping to 12.8 million in 2008. There was a further 9.3% reduction in 2009 with passenger numbers falling to around 11.6 million and the number of aircraft movements reducing by 13.6% to 103,536. However passenger numbers in 2010 increased to 12 million, and increased again in 2011 to 12.8 million and decreased slightly to 12.5 million in 2012. Passenger numbers increased to 12.9 million in 2013. Cargo operations are decreasing each year.

Statistics

Annual traffic

Busiest routes

Ground transport
Two roads accesses the airport – the MA-21 (Torremolinos–Málaga). The new access road from the MA20 is now open.

Transportation hub

Málaga Airport now has a transportation hub outside the new terminal 3 that can be accessed from the new terminal building from both the arrivals and departures levels. There is an arrivals floor and a departures floor. The bus station and the suburban train station can be reached from the arrivals level, and both car parks can be reached from the departures level down a long covered walkway.

Suburban railway line

The airport has an underground station for Cercanías Málaga commuter trains, connecting with Málaga, providing enhanced communications with the city center. The station opened on 10 September 2010 and is located at the arrivals area of Terminal 3. Trains run every 20 minutes between Málaga City and Fuengirola via Málaga Airport.
>

Bus station
There is a bus station located underground at the airport. It can be reached from the arrivals level of the transportation hub or from arrivals in terminal 3, which can be accessed from all terminals. There is also a bus stop outside the cargo terminal.

Following a collaborative agreement between the Málaga Metropolitan Transport Consortium, the Málaga Transport Company (EMTSAM) and the Portillo Avanza bus company, a new public information and bus ticket sale point is now in operation at Málaga Airport.

Car parks
Before the new terminal opened the airport had only one large car park, called P2. The airport now has two, with 3,700 spaces (1,200 in P2, 2,500 in the new P1). All outdoor spaces now have covers over them. They can also be reached by the transportation hub.

Accidents and incidents
 13 September 1964 – A Balair Fokker F-27 (registration HB-AAI) approaching the runway too high. The pilot did a steep descent and the plane landed heavily, causing part of a wing to break off. There were no fatalities. The aircraft was written off.
 20 December 1970 – A Sobelair Douglas DC-6B (registration OO-CTL) returned to Málaga due to severe weather at the aircraft's destination. A hydraulic system failure occurred and the left main undercarriage gear failed. This caused the aircraft to veer left once it landed. There were no fatalities. The aircraft was written off.
 13 September 1982 – Spantax Flight BX995 a DC-10-30CF (registration EC-DEG) When the aircraft was rolling for take-off, the pilot felt a strong vibration and aborted the take-off. The flightcrew lost control of the aircraft and were unable to stop in the runway length available. The aircraft overran the runway, hit an airfield aerial installation, and lost an engine. It crossed the Málaga–Torremolinos Highway, hitting three vehicles before hitting a farming construction and bursting into flames. An emergency evacuation of the aircraft was carried out but 50 on board died, and a further 110 persons were hospitalized. The cause of the accident was the detachment of fragments from a recapped tread on the right wheel of the nose gear, creating vibration.
 13 October 2000 - The hijacked Sabena Flight 689 operated by an Airbus A330-200 en route from Brussels to Abidjan made an emergency landing at Málaga where the perpetrator, a Nigerian national, was overpowered by police.
 29 August 2001 – Binter Mediterráneo Flight BIM8261 a CASA CN-235 (registration EC-FBC) was on a flight from Melilla to Málaga. On final approach the aircraft's left engine failed, and the aircraft made an emergency landing. The plane hit the first edge lights and stopped next to the N-340. Investigation into the accident revealed that shortly after the initial engine failure, the First Officer inadvertently shut down both of the aircraft's engines, leading to a total loss of power. Four out of the 44 people on board were killed, including the pilot Capt. Fdez. Ruano. The aircraft was written off.

See also
 ENAIRE
 List of works by Ricardo Bofill Taller de Arquitectura

References

External links

 Official website
 
 

Airports in Andalusia
Buildings and structures in the Province of Málaga
Airports established in 1919
1919 establishments in Spain
Airport railway stations in Spain
Ricardo Bofill buildings